Lisa Wieland is the current CEO of the Massachusetts Port Authority and has been in office since June 2019. She was selected in a five to two vote over the head of Boston's Planning & Development Agency, Brian Golden, by Massport's Board of Directors. Weiland permanently replaces longtime Massport CEO Thomas Glynn.

Early life and career

Wieland attended undergrad at the University of California, Los Angeles and went on to get a masters of business administration at Harvard Business School. Prior to joining Massport, Wieland worked as a consultant at Bain & Company and as an editor for CNN. In addition to working with Bain, CNN, and Massport, Wieland is a member of the U.S. Department of Transportation's Maritime System National Advisory Committee, one of three women who serve on the committee.

Time with Massport

Wieland joined Massport in 2006. In 2013, she was promoted to Chief Administrative Officer for Maritime, before becoming the Port Director for Boston in 2015. She remained in that role until she was chosen as the newest CEO of Massport in 2019. Wieland beat out over 100 applicants for the role.

In January 2019, Wieland was honored with the Pinnacle Award  by the Greater Boston Chamber of Commerce for her leadership and contributions to the local quality of life while serving at Massport.

References

University of California, Los Angeles alumni
Harvard Business School alumni
Massachusetts Port Authority people
Year of birth missing (living people)
Living people